Mount Wilson is a mountain in Mohave County, Arizona, U.S. At , it is the second highest point of the Black Mountains after Mount Perkins.

Mount Wilson Wilderness is a 23,900-acre protected wilderness area centered around the mountain, established in 1990 under the Arizona Desert Wilderness Act and managed by the Bureau of Land Management. This desert wilderness includes eight miles of the Wilson Ridge and is surrounded by the Lake Mead National Recreation Area.

References

External links
 Mount Wilson Wilderness – Wilderness Connect
 
 
 

Mountains of Arizona
Landforms of Mohave County, Arizona
Mountains of Mohave County, Arizona
IUCN Category Ib
Wilderness areas of Arizona
Protected areas of Mohave County, Arizona
Protected areas established in 1990
1990 establishments in Arizona